The Search for the Red Dragon, by James A. Owen, is a fantasy novel released on January 1, 2008. It is the second book in The Chronicles of the Imaginarium Geographica. It is preceded by Here, There Be Dragons and followed by The Indigo King.

Plot overview 
Nine years after the events of the original book, protagonists Jack, John, and Charles are requested by Laura Glue (the granddaughter of Peter Pan) to contact their predecessor Sir James Barrie. Thereafter all four accompany Bert (H.G. Wells) to Paralon, the Archipelago's capital; discover a message meant for Peter Pan; and learn that most of the magical Dragonships have been stolen and most of the children of the Archipelago have disappeared. Leaving Paralon, the party visit the Keep of Time, which they find damaged by their last adventure.  There, the Archipelago's Cartographer (Merlin) directs them to the 'Underneath', an island concealed by the waters of the Archipelago. There, they are attacked by the descendants of the failed Roanoke exploration, led by Richard Burton. Escaping him, the protagonists reach Neverland, where Daedalus reveals to them that the Underneath is divided into nine districts (as in Dante's Inferno), and asks them to become children themselves to better understand Hugh the Iron and William the Pig, the sons of Jason and the original Lost Boys. Jack assents, and the party departs Neverland. Jack is captured on the isle of Automata, but rescued on Aiaia from an 'Abbey of the Rose', alongside other children; later, Burton demands the whereabouts of his daughter Lillith until Hugh the Iron and William the Pig arrive, accompanied by a mysterious leader who controls children by means of panpipes.  In the Ninth Circle of the Underneath, Jack enters Plato's Cave and resumes adulthood to save Peter Pan, imprisoned inside. Meanwhile, Daedalus has surrounded the protagonists by gigantic automata; but these are overcome by Titans, summoned by John. Daedalus is killed, and Hugh and William released.  Upon Peter Pan's return, the companions learn that the specter controlling Hugh and William is the antagonist 'Winter King' (Mordred/Captain Hook), whom Peter repels.  The companions return to Paralon, and thence to their own world, where they are reunited with Sir James Barrie.

2008 American novels
American fantasy novels
The Chronicles of the Imaginarium Geographica
Modern Arthurian fiction